Southern France, also known as the South of France or colloquially in French as , is a defined geographical area consisting of the regions of France that border the Atlantic Ocean south of the Marais Poitevin, Spain, the Mediterranean Sea and Italy. It includes southern Nouvelle-Aquitaine in the west, Occitanie in the centre, the southern parts of Auvergne-Rhône-Alpes in the northeast, Provence-Alpes-Côte d'Azur in the southeast, as well as the island of Corsica in the southeast. Southern France is generally included into Southern Europe because of its association with the Mediterranean Sea.

The time of midday was synonymous with south because in France, as in the rest of the Northern Hemisphere north of the Tropic of Cancer, the sun is in the south at noon. The synonymy has existed since Middle French as well;  could refer to both midday and south. The Midi is considered to start at Valence, hence the saying  ("At Valence the Midi starts).
Regions of France

Geography
Despite being part of Occitania, the regions of Auvergne and Limousin are not normally considered part of southern France. The largest cities of southern France are Marseille, Toulouse, Bordeaux, Nice and Montpellier. The Pyrenees and French Alps are also located in the area, in respectively its southwestern and eastern parts. Corsica, which is south of Continental France and just north of Sardinia, Italy, may also be included.

Tourism
Notable touristic landmarks include the Roman-era Pont du Gard and the Arena of Nîmes; the Verdon Gorge, in Alpes-de-Haute-Provence; the Canal du Midi, linking Toulouse by to the Mediterranean Sea; and the natural regions of Larzac, Luberon and Camargue. The French Riviera is in southern France's southeastern quadrant. Several towns in southern France are renowned for their architecture and surroundings, such as Roussillon, Ménerbes, Cordes-sur-Ciel, Gordes, Rocamadour, Rennes-le-Château, Les Baux-de-Provence, Lourmarin, Gassin, Saint-Paul-de-Vence, L'Isle-sur-la-Sorgue, Seillans, Crillon-le-Brave and Saint-Rémy-de-Provence.

Cuisine
Southern France has a cuisine that is different from those of northern France and other Mediterranean countries. The major difference from the rest of France is in the use of olive oil, instead of butter. Local agriculture supplies the olives for consumption as well as cooking, the ducks and geese to make foie gras, haricot beans that are used in cassoulet, the sheep whose milk produces Roquefort cheese, tomatoes and melons. To accompany the richer food, the area also supplies much stronger wines, from Bordeaux, Cahors, Madiran, and Languedoc, all of which are washed down with brandy from Armagnac.

Films
The following films are set in Southern France:

See also
 Occitania
Gascony
Béarn
 Northern Basque Country
 Mediterranean Sea
 Northern Catalonia
 Novempopulania
 Corsica
 Southern Italy
 Southern Europe
 Vichy France

References

Geography of France
Geography of Southwestern Europe